Estrella Foothills High School is a comprehensive high school campus located in Goodyear, Arizona. Estrella Foothills High School is a part of the Buckeye Union High School District. The school mascot is the wolf.

Estrella Foothills High School opened its doors in August 2001. Opening with a freshman class of 110 students, the first graduating class of approximately 160 students received their diplomas in May 2005. There are approximately 1,160 students currently enrolled. From 2008 to 2011, EFHS maintained "Excelling" status, at the time the highest rank awarded to Arizona's public schools. Estrella Foothills high school is currently ranked ‘B’ by the Arizona Department of Education. For over a decade, Estrella Foothills has exceeded the state average in mathematics and English language arts.

Estrella Foothills offers a wide range of academic classes (offered in block scheduling), including honors and AP courses, as well as many diverse electives including culinary arts, sports medicine, medical assisting, carpentry, education professions, band and choir, theatre and technical theatre, business, computer science, engineering, forensic science, dance,  graphic design, creative writing, psychology, criminal law/sociology, and art. The school's CTE courses are part of the joint technological education district West-MEC.

Estrella Foothills offers extracurricular activities such as Career and Technical Student Organizations, National Honor Society, Drama Club and Thespians, Art Club, Dance Club, Newspaper,Interact, SHPE (including a robotics team), The Pythagorean Society, Earth Club, and many more.

Students at Estrella Foothills are encouraged to be well-rounded and volunteer in community and charitable events. Among these, the Drama Club and SkillsUSA chapter sponsors four blood drives through Vitalant each year. Interact Club regularly visits local charities and organizes drives for food and clothing. The student council organizes school and community events such as the annual Homecoming Carnival and Parade, Prom, and pep assemblies.

In athletics, Estrella Foothills is a member of the 4A Conference of the Arizona Interscholastic Association. The Wolves have distinguished themselves in their twelve years of varsity programs, having sent most of their teams to state playoff competitions at some point.  Their first state championships came in track and field.  The school has also celebrated state championships in spiritline, girls soccer, softball, girls track, tennis, and boys basketball teams.

Notable alumni
 Corey Hawkins (class of 2010) – semi-professional  basketball player and son of NBA All-Star, Hersey Hawkins

References

External links
 School website

Public high schools in Arizona
Schools in Maricopa County, Arizona
Educational institutions established in 2001
Goodyear, Arizona
2001 establishments in Arizona